State Route 74 (SR-74)—also called Alpine Highway—is a state highway in the U.S. state of Utah.

Route description
The route's southern end is at the intersection of US-89 (Main Street) and 100 East in American Fork. From here it proceeds north as Alpine Highway.

History
The route was established as a state highway May 12, 1931. It was originally planned as part of SR-71, but that route was shortened and the section from Alpine to American Fork was redesignated as SR-74 in 1935. For over 70 years, the route alignment remained essentially the same, with only minor legislative description changes. In 1953 the southern end was defined as the intersection with SR-1 (historic US-91). In 1965, SR-8 (the old designation for US-6) was extended north to Lehi, and SR-74's description was amended to terminate at this intersection. In 1969, SR-8 was separated from US-6, leaving just the section from Moark Junction north to Lehi, with SR-8 being deleted altogether in 1977 and that stretch being assigned to route 89. SR-74's description was updated accordingly to reflect the numbering change. All through this, the route remained essentially unchanged, until 2003, when the northernmost  was removed from the highway system and transferred to the city of Alpine.

Major intersections

References

074
 074
American Fork, Utah
Streets in Utah